Ruusuvuori is a Finnish surname that may refer to 
Aarno Ruusuvuori (1925–1992), Finnish architect, director of the Museum of Finnish Architecture
Emil Ruusuvuori (born 1999), Finnish tennis player
Juha Ruusuvuori (born 1957), Finnish freelance writer

Finnish-language surnames